The 1973 USAC Championship Car season consisted of 16 races, beginning in College Station, Texas on April 7 and concluding in Avondale, Arizona on November 3. The first race of the season, in Avondale, Arizona on March 17,  was postponed by rain and eventually cancelled due to infrastructure damage caused by the rain and scheduling conflicts. Bob Criss was killed in a private test at Phoenix before he could enter another event. He was 35 years old. The USAC National Champion was Roger McCluskey and the Indianapolis 500 winner was Gordon Johncock.

In this tragic season, two drivers were killed at the Indianapolis Motor Speedway. Art Pollard died in an accident while practicing for the Indy 500 while Swede Savage, who crashed during the race, died by complications one month later. Another driver, Salt Walther, suffered serious burns surviving a crash at the start of the race.
In response to those accidents, USAC revised the rules in time for the Pocono 500. The rear wing width was cut back from 64 inches to 55, fuel tank capacity was drastically reduced (from 75 gallons to 40) and the allowable fuel to be consumed in a 500-mile race was reduced from 375 gallons to 340.

Schedule and results
All races running on Oval/Speedway.

 Postponed due to infrastructure damage, and again on March 28 due to continued flooding. Eventually cancelled due to scheduling conflicts.
 Scheduled for 500 miles, stopped early due to rain. See 1973 Indy 500

Final points standings

Note: Sam Posey, Peter Revson, Mark Donohue, David Hobbs, Jerry Grant, John Cannon, Graham McRae and Bobby Allison are not eligible for points. The Rookie of the Year was not awarded, because every rookie was not eligible for points.

References
 
 
 
 
 http://media.indycar.com/pdf/2011/IICS_2011_Historical_Record_Book_INT6.pdf  (p. 225-227)
 http://www.champcarstats.com/drivers/CrissBob.htm

See also
 1973 Indianapolis 500

USAC Championship Car season
USAC Championship Car
1973 in American motorsport